Tunbridge Wells Homeopathic Hospital was a former NHS hospital in Tunbridge Wells, England, that specialised in homeopathic treatments.

History
The facility was founded by the merger of a group of four homeopathic dispensaries in Bristol into a single premises in Church Road, Tunbridge Wells in 1902. A new wing was added in 1924 and further extensions were added in 1930.

Following a drop in referrals and a review by the West Kent Primary Care Trust of funding for homeopathy, the hospital, then one of four homeopathic hospitals operated by the National Health Service, closed in 2009.

References 

1902 establishments in England
2009 disestablishments in England
Defunct hospitals in England
Homeopathic hospitals in the United Kingdom
Hospitals in Kent
Buildings and structures in Royal Tunbridge Wells